The  superyacht Anna I was launched by Feadship in 2007 at their Aalsmeer yard. British designer Michael Leach, designed both the interior and exterior of Anna I.
She was put up for sale after her owner took delivery of his new  yacht, also named Anna.

Design 
The yacht is Lloyd's registered, issued by Cayman Islands.

Engines 
She is powered by twin 2,000hp Caterpillar 3516B engines.

See also
 List of motor yachts by length
 List of yachts built by Feadship

References

2007 ships
Motor yachts
Ships built in the Netherlands